North Hurricane Township is one of twenty townships in Fayette County, Illinois, USA.  As of the 2010 census, its population was 257 and it contained 106 housing units.  This township, along with South Hurricane Township, formed when Hurricane Township split sometime after 1921.

Geography

Cemeteries
The township contains these six cemeteries: Casey, Craig, Halford, Little Hickory, Mount Carmel and Stokes.

Landmarks
 Ramsey Lake State Recreation Area (west quarter)

School districts
 Nokomis Community Unit School District 22
 Ramsey Community Unit School District 204

Political districts
 Illinois' 17th congressional district
 State House District 98
 State Senate District 49

References
 
 United States Census Bureau 2007 TIGER/Line Shapefiles
 United States National Atlas

External links
 City-Data.com
 Illinois State Archives

Townships in Fayette County, Illinois
Townships in Illinois